iOS 12 is the twelfth major release of the iOS mobile operating system developed by Apple Inc. Aesthetically similar to its predecessor, iOS 11, it focuses more on performance than on new features, quality improvements and security updates. Announced at the company's Worldwide Developers Conference on June 4, 2018, iOS 12 was released to the public on September 17, 2018. It was succeeded for the iPhone and iPod Touch by iOS 13 on September 19, 2019 and for the iPad by iPadOS 13 on September 24, 2019. Security updates for iOS 12 have continued for four years following the release of iOS 13 for devices unable to run the newer operating system. The latest update, 12.5.7, was released on January 23, 2023.

Overview

iOS 12 was introduced by Craig Federighi at the Apple Worldwide Developers Conference keynote address on June 4, 2018. The first developer beta version was released after the keynote presentation, with the first public beta released on June 25, 2018. The initial release of version 12.0 was on September 17, 2018.

System features

Performance
Performance optimizations were made in order to speed up common tasks across all supported iOS devices. Tests done by Apple on an iPhone 6 Plus showed apps launching 40% faster, the system keyboard activating 50% faster, and the camera opening 70% faster compared to iOS 11.

Screen Time

Screen Time is a new feature in iOS 12 that records the amount of time a user spent on the device. The feature also displays the amount of time the user used particular apps, the amount of time the user used particular categories of apps (such as games), and the number of notifications the user received.

Screen Time also provides blocking features to limit usage of apps (with time limits) or set other restrictions such as on purchases or explicit content. It replaces Restrictions in the iOS Settings app, but can also be used by adults to limit their own usage. These features can be used with or without a passcode. Without setting a passcode, the limits can easily be bypassed but may serve as a useful reminder of usage goals.

In January 2018, investors JANA Partners and the California State Teachers' Retirement System had issued a public letter to Apple, calling for them to take additional responsibility for the "unintentional negative consequences" that iPhones may have on younger users, and to seek out new ways to limit these effects. In June 2018, after the announcement of the Screen Time feature, Tim Cook publicly admitted that he "was spending a lot more time than [he] should" on his phone. JANA Partners and CalSTRS issued a second letter to express their support for the new feature.

Shortcuts
A dedicated application in iOS 12 allows users to set up Shortcuts, automated actions that the user can ask Siri to perform. Using the Shortcuts app, a user can create a phrase and type in the action they want Siri to do for them. Once they tell the phrase to Siri, Siri will automatically do the task they set for it in the Shortcuts app. The Shortcuts app replaces the Workflow app that Apple acquired in March 2017.

ARKit 2
ARKit now allows users to share their view with other iOS 12-supported devices. ARKit 2 additionally allows full 2D image tracking and incorporates the ability to detect 3D objects.

CarPlay
CarPlay now supports third-party navigation applications. (Waze, Google Maps, etc.)

iPad
The Voice Memos and Stocks apps are now available for iPads. 

Control Center is separated from the app switcher on iPad and can be opened with a swipe down on the top right corner. The status bar has been redesigned, and in addition, iPhone X-style gestures are introduced across all iPads running iOS 12.

Keyboard 
In iOS 12, the trackpad mode (which allows the user to freely move the cursor) is enabled by long-pressing the space bar on devices without 3D Touch.

App Switcher 
For devices with gesture navigation and no home button (iPhone X and later), users can now force quit applications by swiping up from the bottom of the screen (without having to press and hold on them when in the app switcher).

Exposure Notification API 
On December 14, 2020, Apple released iOS 12.5, which includes the Exposure Notification API (backported from iOS 13) that provides access to the Apple / Google privacy-preserving contact tracing system that Apple have developed jointly with Google. This is provided to support digital contact tracing which came to light during the COVID-19 pandemic.

App features

Messages
Messages in iOS 12 introduces a new type of customizable Animoji called "Memoji" which allows a user to create a 3D character of themselves. Apple also introduced Koala, Tiger, Ghost, and T-Rex Animojis. In addition, Apple added new text and GIF effects similar to those found on other social media applications.

FaceTime
FaceTime gains support for Animoji and Memoji, as well as new text and GIF effects similar to those found on other social media applications and in the Messages application.

iOS 12.1, released on October 30, 2018, adds the ability to include up to 32 people in a FaceTime conversation. This feature is only supported with video by devices with the Apple A8X or Apple A9 chip or later; it is only supported for audio on iPhone 5S, iPhone 6, and iPhone 6 Plus, and is not available at all on iPad Mini 2, iPad Mini 3, and iPad Air. Group FaceTime was disabled on January 28, 2019 due to a software bug that allowed calls to be answered by the caller rather than the recipient, allowing video and audio to be transmitted unless the call was declined. The functionality got restored on February 7, 2019, with the release of iOS 12.1.4. Group FaceTime remains disabled on devices running iOS 12 that are affected by the bug.

Measure

Measure is a native AR application that allows the user to take measurements of real objects. It also works as a level, a feature that was originally packaged as part of the Compass app.

Photos
Photos has been completely redesigned with four new tabs, including "Photos," "For You," "Albums," and "Search." The new "For You" tab replaces the "Memories" tab previously found in iOS 11 and makes sharing recommendations, creates short-length video collages, photo editing suggestions, as well as featured photos from a specific day. 

While the "Photos" and "Albums" tabs received only a few cosmetic changes, the "Search" tab includes new Artificial Intelligence and Machine Learning features which show the user photos by place and categories (e.g. animals, cars, objects).

Notifications
Notifications are now grouped by application and have a "manage" button to turn off notifications for that app or to deliver them quietly right from the Notification Center without having to go into the Settings application.

Do Not Disturb
Do Not Disturb gives users more options for automation. Users can hide notifications indefinitely or scheduled like previously, but can also hide notifications for 1 hour, until a time of day, until leaving a location, or until the end of a scheduled event in Calendar.

Voice Memos and Stocks
Voice Memos and Stocks are supported on iPad, and have a newer design. Stocks was integrated with Apple News to show financial and other related news.

Apple Books
iBooks was renamed Apple Books, and the app was redesigned, with five new tabs, including "Reading Now," "Library," "Book Store," "Audio Books," and "Search." The new app design is similar to that of Apple Music, and has been praised for its simplicity in allowing users to easily navigate their book library.

Safari
Safari receives an update to Intelligent Tracking Prevention. This includes a feature which allows the user to disable social media "like" and "share" buttons.

Maps
Apple Maps had started to be rebuilt from the ground up by relying on first-party map data instead of using map data provided by third parties. This allows for more accurate directions and predictions on the fastest routes. The new maps were rolled out in sections and the entire US completed by the end of 2019.

Problems

Rainbow flag emoji
After a rainbow flag emoji with an interdictory sign over it appeared on Twitter, several users accused Apple of encouraging anti-LGBT attitudes. However, Emojipedia has clarified that this occurs when a user tweets the two emojis together and is not an intended feature. This can be used with other emojis as well.

FaceTime eavesdropping issue

A FaceTime issue impacting several versions of iOS 12 (versions 12.1–12.1.3) allowed users to call someone via FaceTime and hear the audio coming from their phone before answering the call, before the bug was fixed in iOS 12.1.4.

Supported devices
Any device that supports iOS 11 can be upgraded to iOS 12. However, devices with an A7 or A8 chip and 1GB of RAM, such as the iPhone 5S, 6, 6 Plus, and the iPod Touch (6th generation), have limited support. 
These are the list of the devices that support iOS 12:

iPhone
iPhone 5S
iPhone 6 & 6 Plus
iPhone 6S & 6S Plus
iPhone SE (1st generation)
iPhone 7 & 7 Plus
iPhone 8 & 8 Plus
iPhone X
iPhone XS & XS Max
iPhone XR

iPod Touch
iPod Touch (6th generation)
iPod Touch (7th generation)

iPad
iPad Air (1st generation)
iPad Air 2
iPad Air (3rd generation)
iPad (5th generation)
iPad (6th generation)
iPad Mini 2
iPad Mini 3
iPad Mini 4
iPad Mini (5th generation)
iPad Pro (9.7-inch)
iPad Pro (10.5-inch)
iPad Pro (11-inch, 1st generation)
iPad Pro (12.9-inch, 1st generation)
iPad Pro (12.9-inch, 2nd generation)
iPad Pro (12.9-inch, 3rd generation)

Version history 

Legend:

References

External links
 

12
2018 software
Products introduced in 2018
Mobile operating systems
Tablet operating systems
Proprietary operating systems